Delectosaurus is a genus of dicynodont from Late Permian (Changhsingian) of Russia.

References

Dicynodonts
Permian animals
Extinct animals of Russia
Anomodont genera